Reade may refer to:

 Reade (name), given name and surname
 Reade Township, Cambria County, Pennsylvania, United States

See also
 
 
 Read (disambiguation)
 Reed (disambiguation)
 Reid (disambiguation)